Ira Miller is an American former sportswriter who is best known for his almost 29-year tenure as a football writer for the San Francisco Chronicle.

Career
Miller covered both the San Francisco 49ers and the Oakland Raiders during his career. He also served as President of the Pro Football Writers of America.

Awards and honors
Miller is the 1993 winner of the Dick McCann Memorial Award from the Pro Football Hall of Fame.

References

American sportswriters
Dick McCann Memorial Award recipients